Tympanic artery can refer to:
 Anterior tympanic artery (arteria tympanica anterior)
 Inferior tympanic artery (arteria tympanica inferior)
 Superior tympanic artery (arteria tympanica superior)